The UAW-Ford National Programs Center is a tall building in Hart Plaza, Downtown Detroit, Michigan. The high-rise building was constructed in 1948–1950 as the Veterans Memorial Building.

Architecture
The Veterans Memorial Building was designed in the International style by the firm of Harley, Ellington and Day, which also designed the nearby 211 West Fort Street Building and the Coleman A. Young Municipal Center. The building exterior is faced with marble to conform with the master plan of the Civic Center. Windows on the east and west walls are square with a single marble frame extending the length of each floor. Above the eagle at the roof line are 13 stars. The building was dedicated on June 11, 1950, as the Veterans Memorial Building; it housed offices for city agencies and veterans groups.

The main building area contains a 450-seat theater-style conference and a 200-seat lecture hall, both on the ground level. The rear entrance (on the Atwater Street level) also contains a lobby, and another on the second level at the Jefferson Avenue entrance.

In September 1995, the United Auto Workers and the City of Detroit reached a long-term agreement to lease the structure, after which it was remodeled to house UAW offices. The remodel included adding a large window above the eagle on the North wall. The remodel was completed on 1 October 1997.

In 2008, the structure received the Twenty-five Year Award from the Michigan Chapter of the American Institute of Architects.

This building is located between Cobo Hall and Hart Plaza. Although its address is on Jefferson Avenue, it is located several feet south of Jefferson on Civic Center Drive. To the west are seven pylons which were also carved by Marshall Fredericks, which depict the founding of Detroit and the ends of several conflicts in which the US played a part.

References

External links
 Google Maps' location of the UAW-Ford National Programs Center

Skyscraper office buildings in Detroit
Office buildings in Detroit
United Auto Workers
International style architecture in Michigan
Modernist architecture in Michigan
Ford Motor Company
Trade union buildings in the United States